Mount Galla is a snow-capped mountain,  high, which rises above the Usas Escarpment,  east of Mount Petras, in Marie Byrd Land, Antarctica. It was mapped by the United States Geological Survey from surveys and U.S. Navy air photos, 1959–65, and was named by the Advisory Committee on Antarctic Names for Lieutenant Edward J. Galla, U.S. Navy, who was medical doctor and leader of support personnel at Byrd Station, 1959.

References

Mountains of Marie Byrd Land